Guildford bus station serves the town of Guildford, Surrey, England. Also known as the Friary bus station, it is located on the east side of the Friary Shopping Centre.

Description
Guildford is served by many bus routes from Woking, Aldershot, Godalming and other local places in Surrey. The main bus station, which is the terminus for all routes heading into Guildford, is on Commercial Road (off North Street). It has 22 stands with stands 1–15 accessed from the covered area adjacent to the Friary Centre and 16–22 situated alongside Commercial Road. All arriving buses off-load passengers at the entrance to the station.

The bus station was refurbished in 2010 with Guildford Borough Council and Surrey County Council investing in the improvements.

Currently, 2022, there are proposals by developers to reduce the size of the bus station to allow a major redevelopment of the North Street and Commercial Road area.

Service operators
Principal bus companies operating from the Friary are:
 Carlone Buses
 Compass Bus
 Falcon Buses
 Safeguard Coaches
 Stagecoach South
 White Bus Services

Stagecoach operates services 1 and 2 on contract to Surrey University, linking the two campuses, Royal Surrey County Hospital, and the principal student residential areas. It also operates the park and ride services using a fleet of nine electric buses.

References

Buildings and structures in Guildford
Bus stations in England
Transport in Guildford